Samuel Lover (24 February 1797 – 6 July 1868), also known as "Ben Trovato" ("well invented"), was an Irish songwriter, composer and novelist, and a portrait painter, chiefly in miniatures. He was the grandfather of Victor Herbert.

Life
Lover was born at No. 60 Grafton Street, Dublin and went to school at Samuel Whyte's at No. 79, which now houses Bewley's Café. By 1830 he was Secretary of the Royal Hibernian Academy and living at No. 9 D'Olier Street. In 1835 he moved to London and began composing music for a series of comic stage works. For some, like the operetta Il Paddy Whack in Italia (1841), he contributed libretto and music, for others just a few songs.

Lover produced many Irish songs, of which several, such as The Angel's Whisper, Molly Bawn (song)|Molly Bawn, and The Four-leaved Shamrock, gained popularity. He also wrote novels, of which Rory O'Moore (in its first form a ballad), and Handy Andy are best known, and short Irish sketches, which with his songs he combined into a popular entertainment called Irish Nights or Irish Evenings, with which he toured North America in 1846–1848. He joined Charles Dickens in founding Bentley's Magazine.

"When once the itch of literature comes over a man, nothing can cure it but the scratching of a pen." – Samuel Lover

Lover's daughter Fanny was mother to Victor Herbert, a composer remembered for many musicals and operettas premièred on Broadway. As a child he lived with the Lovers in a musical environment after the divorce of his mother.

Death and legacy

Lover died on 6 July 1868 in Saint Helier, Jersey. A memorial in St Patrick's Cathedral, Dublin marks his achievements: "Poet, painter, novelist and composer, who, in the exercise of a genius as distinguished in its versatility as in its power, by his pen and pencil illustrated so happily the characteristics of the peasantry of his country that his name will ever be honourably identified with Ireland."

In popular culture
In the 2013 computer game "BioShock Infinite", the Lover piece "Saddle The Pony" (from Rory O'More), is heard in Battleship Bay, where Elizabeth is seen dancing to it. It is performed by an accordion player, a violinist and a pianist.

Selected writings
Songs and Legends of the Irish People (1831)
Legends and Stories of Ireland (London: Richard Edward King, n.d. [1834])
Rory O'More: A National Romance. Novel (London: R. Bentley, 1837; repr. London: F. Warne & Co., 1879)
Songs and Ballads (London: Chapman and Hall, 1839)
Handy Andy. A Tale of Irish Life (London: George Routledge and Sons, 1841)
Treasure Trove/He Would Be a Gentleman

Selected compositions
Stage (to his own librettos)
Rory O'More, comic opera (1837)
The White Horse of the Peppers, dramatic romance (1838)
Snap Apple Night, or A Kick-up in Kerry, musical drama (1839)
The Greek Boy, musical drama (1840)
Il Paddy Whack in Italia, 1-act-operetta (1841)
The Irish Tourist's Ticket [music only, text by P.H. Hatch] (1853)

Bibliography
William Bayle Bernard: Life of Samuel Lover (London: H.S. King & Co. and New York: D. Appleton & Co., 1874)
Andrew James Symington: Samuel Lover: A Biographical Sketch (London: Blackie & Son, 1880)

References

External links

Interpretations

 performed by Sydney Children's Choir; arranged by Jessica Wells
"The Angels Whisper", from "Storm and Calm" by Hawp and available on YouTube. Original melody and arrangement by Andy Webster. 

1797 births
1868 deaths
19th-century classical composers
19th-century Irish novelists
19th-century Irish painters
19th-century Irish male artists
19th-century male musicians
19th-century male writers
Burials at Kensal Green Cemetery
Irish classical composers
Irish expatriates in the United Kingdom
Irish folklorists
Irish librettists
Irish male novelists
Irish male painters
Irish opera composers
Irish songwriters
Male opera composers
Musicians from Dublin (city)